Parliamentary elections were held in Finland between 1 and 3 July 1922. The Social Democratic Party remained the largest in Parliament with 53 of the 200 seats. The caretaker government of Professor Aimo Cajander (Progressive), that President Kaarlo Juho Ståhlberg had appointed in June 1922, following the resignation of Prime Minister Juho Vennola (Progressive), remained in office until Kyösti Kallio formed an Agrarian-Progressive minority government in November 1922. Voter turnout was 58.5%.

Background
By 1922, the Finnish society, economy and politics had begun to stabilize. The Progressive (liberal) President Kaarlo Juho Ståhlberg had pardoned many Red (socialist) prisoners of the Finnish Civil War, the worst poverty caused by World War I and the Civil War was over, and the Agrarian leader, Kyösti Kallio, was preparing a law (Lex Kallio) that would distribute the excess farmlands of wealthy landowners to the former tenant farmers and other landless rural people. The Social Democrats, led by Väinö Tanner, had committed themselves to the peaceful and democratic pursuit of socialist reform goals. The mostly Agrarian-Progressive minority governments pursued moderate and conciliatory policies. Compulsory schooling of Finnish children was enacted in 1921. The Communists dared to organize the Socialist Workers' Party before the elections, so they preferred open political activity to underground political activity. Shortly before the election campaign officially started, the Finnish Parliament rejected a five-year defence treaty between Finland, Poland, Latvia and Estonia. Enough deputies doubted the ability of Poland and the Baltic countries to defend Finland during a real war.

Results

See also
List of members of the Parliament of Finland, 1922–1924

References

General elections in Finland
Finland
Parliament
Finland
Election and referendum articles with incomplete results